The 1973 Little All-America college football team, also known as the Small College All-America football team, is composed of college football players from small colleges and universities who were selected by the Associated Press (AP) as the best players at each position. For 1973, the AP selected three teams, each team having separate offensive and defensive platoons.

Walter Payton, who went on to set NFL records for career rushing yards and touchdowns, was named to the second team as a running back. The first-team running backs were Billy "White Shoes" Johnson of Widener 1,496 rushing yards, 23 touchdowns), freshman Wilbert Montgomery of Abilene Christian (compiling a record 31 touchdowns in the regular season, 37 including post-season), and Mike Thomas of UNLV (1,741 rushing yards.

Kim McQuilken of Lehigh was the first-team quarterback. He completed 62.5% of his passes for 2,603 yards and 19 touchdowns.

Defensive end Ed "Too Tall" Jones from Tennessee State stood out on the defensive squad and was the No. 1 pick in the 1974 NFL Draft.

First team

Offense
 Quarterback - Kim McQuilken (senior, 6'2", 205 pounds), Lehigh
 Running back - Billy "White Shoes" Johnson (junior, 5'9", 175 pounds), Widener
 Running back - Wilbert Montgomery (freshman, 5'11", 190 pounds), Abilene Christian
 Running back - Mike Thomas (junior, 5'11", 188 pounds), UNLV
 Wide receiver - Don Hutt (senior, 6'1", 194 pounds), Boise State
 Tight end - Scott Garske (senior, 6'4", 240 pounds), Eastern Washington
 Tackle - Steve Drongowski (senior, 6'0", 215 pounds), Wittenberg
 Tackle - Henry Lawrence (senior, 6'4", 253 pounds), Florida A&M
 Guard - Joe Kotval (senior, 6'3", 250 pounds), Buena Vista
 Guard - Herbert Scott (junior, 6'3", 245 pounds), Virginia Union
 Center - Mark King (junior, 6'3", 230 pounds), Troy State

Defense
 Defensive end - Ed "Too Tall" Jones (senior, 6'9", 264 pounds), Tennessee State
 Defensive end - Thomas Henderson (junior, 6'4", 225 pounds), Langston
 Defensive tackle - Gary "Big Hands" Johnson (junior, 6'3", 261 pounds), Grambling
 Defensive tackle - Bill Kollar (senior, 6'4}, 251 pounds), Montana State
 Middle guard - Glenn Fleming (sophomore, 6'0", 230 pounds), Northeast Louisiana
 Linebacker - Waymond Bryant (senior, 6'3", 235 pounds), Tennessee State
 Linebacker - Eugene Simms (junior, 6'2", 228 pounds), Morgan State
 Linebacker - Godwin Turk (senior, 6'3", 235 pounds), Southern
 Defensive back - Autry Beamon (junior, 6'2", 195 pounds), East Texas
 Defensive back - Leonard Fairley (senior, 6'0", 192 pounds), Alcorn A&M
 Defensive back - Marty Kranz (senior, 6'2", 190 pounds), Mankato State

Second team

Offense
 QB - Clint Longley, Abilene Christian
 RB - Boyce Callahan, Jacksonville State
 RB - Walter Payton, Jackson State
 RB - Jimmy Smith, Northern Arizona
 WR - Roger Carr, Louisiana Tech
 TE - Bill Schlegel, Lehigh
 T - Gregory Kindle, Tennessee State
 T - John Passananti, Western Illinois
 G - Phil Gustafson, Kearney State
 G - Doug Lowrey, Arkansas State
 C - Ed Paradis, Indiana (Pennsylvania)

Defense
 DE - Jay Buse, Linfield
 DE - Adrian Gant, Livingston
 DT - Fred Dean, Louisiana Tech
 DT - Levi Stanley, Hawaii
 MG - Alan Klein, Southeastern Louisiana
 LB - Terry Factor, Slippery Rock
 LB - Greg Lee, Cal Poly 
 LB - Steve Nelson, North Dakota State
 DB - Ralph Gebhardt, Rochester
 DB - Jim Muir, Elon
 DB - Mike Woodley, Northern Iowa

Third team

Offense
 QB - Prinson Poindexter, Livingston
 RB - Nate Anderson, Eastern Illinois
 RB - Tony Giglio, Lafayette
 RB - Saul Ravanell, Nebraska-Omaha
 WR - John Holland, Tennessee State
 TE - Bernie Peterson, Linfield
 T - Dave Clapham, Nevada-Reno
 T - Jim Pietrzak, Eastern Michigan
 G - Coy Gibson, Wofford
 G - Thomas Saxson, North Carolina Central
 C - R.W. Hicks, Humboldt State

Defense
 DE - Ed McAleny, UMass
 DE - Lawerence Pillers, Alcorn A&M
 DT - Glenn Ellis, Elon
 DT - John Teerlinck, Western Illinois
 MG - Sam Moser, Sioux Falls
 LB - Greg Blankenship, Hayward State
 LB - Joe McNeely, Louisiana Tech
 LB - Charles Battle, Grambling
 DB - William Bryant, Grambling
 DB - Keith Krebsbach, North Dakota State
 DB - Anthony Leonard, Virginia Union

See also
 1973 College Football All-America Team

References

Little All-America college football team
Little All-America college football team
Little All-America college football team
Little All-America college football teams